This is a compilation of the releases for the UK independent record label Heavenly Recordings.

Artists
See Heavenly Recordings#Artists for a list of artists.

Albums
 HVNLP1 - Foxbase Alpha, Saint Etienne (1991)
 HVNLP2 - The Rockingbirds,The Rockingbirds (1992)
 HVNLP3 - Drop Out, East Village (1993)
 HVNLP4 - Wildwood, The Wishing Stones (1991)
 HVNLP5 - Always..., Espiritu (Unreleased)
 HVNLP6 - So Tough, Saint Etienne (1993)
 HVNLP7 - You Need a Mess of Help to Stand Alone, Saint Etienne (1993)
 HVNLP8 - Tiger Bay, Saint Etienne (1994)
 HVNLP9 - I Love to Paint, Saint Etienne (1995)
 HVNLP10 - Too Young to Die - The Singles, Saint Etienne (1995)
 HVNLP11 - Annie on One, Various Artists (1996)
 HVNLP12 - Northern Uproar, Northern Uproar (1996)
 HVNLP13 - Live at The Social Volume 1 - Mixed By The Chemical Brothers, Various Artists (1996)
 HVNLP14 - High in a Basement , Various Artists (1996)
 HVNLP16 - Casino Classics, Saint Etienne (1996)
 HVNLP17 - Trailer Park, Beth Orton (1996)
 HVNLP19 - Yesterday Tomorrow Today, Northern Uproar (1997)
 HVNLP22 - Central Reservation, Beth Orton (1999)
 HVNLP24 - Afterglow, Dot Allison (1999)
 HVNLP26 - Lost Souls, Doves (2000)
 HVNLP27 - Maplewood EP, Ed Harcourt (2000)
 HVNLP29 - Lost Sides (promo), Doves (2000)
 HVNLP31 - Here Be Monsters, Ed Harcourt (2001)
 HVNLP32 - Smash the System: Singles and More, Saint Etienne (2001)
 HVNLP35 - The Last Broadcast, Doves (2002)
 HVNLP36 - Highly Evolved, The Vines (2002)
 HVNLP37 - Daybreaker, Beth Orton (2002)
 HVNLP39 - From Every Sphere, Ed Harcourt (2003)
 HVNLP45 - Pass in Time: The Definitive Collection, Beth Orton (2003)
 HVNLP46 - Lost Sides, Doves (2003)
 HVNLP49 - Strangers, Ed Harcourt (2004)
 HVNLP50 - Some Cities, Doves (2005)
 HVNLP53 - The Magic Numbers, The Magic Numbers (2005)
 HVNLP54 - Elephant's Graveyard, Ed Harcourt (2005)
 HVNLP55 - The Beautiful Lie, Ed Harcourt (2006)
 HVNLP57 - Those the Brokes, The Magic Numbers (2006)
 HVNLP59 - Thirst for Romance, Cherry Ghost (2007)
 HVNLP63 - Until Tomorrow Then: The Best of Ed Harcourt, Ed Harcourt (2007)
 HVNLP67 - Kingdom of Rust, Doves (2009)
 HVNLP69 - London Conversations: The Best of Saint Etienne, Saint Etienne (2009)
 HVNLP70 - Continental - Deluxe Edition, Saint Etienne (2009)
 HVNLP72 - Sound of Water - Deluxe Edition, Saint Etienne (2009)
 HVNLP73 - The Runaway, The Magic Numbers (2010)
 HVNLP76 - The Soft Pack, The Soft Pack (2010)
 HVNLP78 - The Places Between: The Best of Doves, Doves (2010)
 HVNLP79 - Beneath This Burning Shoreline, Cherry Ghost (2010)
 HVNLP80 - "Tales From Turnpike House", Saint Etienne
 HVNLP81 - "Losing Sleep", Edwyn Collins
 HVNLP82 - "Songs For The Ravens", Sea of Bees
 HVNLP83 - "Love & Nature", LCMDF
 HVNLP84 - "The Hill", James Walbourne
 HVNLP85 - "The Head And The Heart", The Head And The Heart
 HVNLP86 - “Tin Tabernacle”, Trevor Moss & Hannah-Lou
 HVNLP87 - “Quality, First, Last & Forever!”, Trevor & Hannah-Lou
 HVNLP88 - “100 Acres of Sycamore”, Fionn Regan
 HVNLP89 - "FOLKROCK", Various Artists
 HVNLP90 - “Pray To Be Free”, James Levy & The Blood Red Rose
 HVNLP91 - “Noah and the Paper Moon”, Stealing Sheep
 HVNLP92 - “Words and Music”, Saint Etienne
 HVNLP93 - “Orangefarben”, Sea Of Bees
 HVNLP94 - “Toy”, Toy
 HVNLP95 - “Into The Diamond Sun”, Stealing Sheep
 HVNLP96 - “Invasion Of Love", Out Cold
 HVNLP98 - "Black Pudding", Mark Lanegan & Duke Garwood
 HVNLP99 - "Clarietta", Charlie Boyer & The Voyeurs
 HVNLP100 - "Sun Structures", Temples
 HVNLP101 - "Imitations", Mark Lanegan
 HVNLP102 - "Join The Dots", Toy

Singles and EPs

HVN 1 - 100
 HVN 1 - "The World According To Sly & Lovechild", Sly & Lovechild (1990)
 HVN 2 - "Only Love Can Break Your Heart", Saint Etienne (1990)
 HVN 3 - "It's On", "Flowered Up" (1990)
 HVN 4 - "Kiss and Make Up", Saint Etienne (1990)
 HVN 6 - "Circles", East Village (1990)
 HVN 7 - "Phobia", "Flowered Up" (1990)
 HVN 8 - "Motown Junk", Manic Street Preachers (1991)
 HVN 9 - "Nothing Can Stop Us", Saint Etienne (1991)
 HVN 10 - "You Love Us", Manic Street Preachers (1991)
 HVN 11 - "Destined to be free/There's a riot going on" Fabulous (1991)
 HVN 14 - "A Good Day For You", The Rockingbirds (1991)
 HVN 15 - "Join Our Club", Saint Etienne (1992)
 HVN 16 - "Weekender", Flowered Up (1992)
 HVN 17 - "Jonathan, Jonathan", The Rockingbirds (1992)
 HVN 19 - The Fred EP, Flowered Up, Saint Etienne and The Rockingbirds (1992)
 HVN 20 - "Francisca", Espiritu (1992)
 HVN 21 - "Gradually Learning", The Rockingbirds (1992)
 HVN 23 - "Avenue", Saint Etienne (1992)
 HVN 25 - "You're in a Bad Way", Saint Etienne (1993)
 HVN 28 - "Conquistador", Espiritu (1993)
 HVN 29 - "Hobart Paving", Saint Etienne (1993)
 HVN 36 - "Xmas 93", Saint Etienne (1993)
 HVN 37 - "Pale Movie", Saint Etienne (1994)
 HVN 40 - "Like a Motorway", Saint Etienne (1994)
 HVN 42 - "Hug My Soul", Saint Etienne (1994)
 HVN 47 - "Rollercoaster/Rough Boys", Northern Uproar (1995)
 HVN 50 - "He's on the Phone", Saint Etienne (1995)
 HVN 51 - "From a Window/This Morning", Northern Uproar (1996)
 HVN 52 - "Livin' It Up", Northern Uproar (1996)
 HVN 53 - "Work Mi Body", Monkey Mafia featuring Patra (1996)
 HVN 54 - "Town", Northern Uproar (1996)
 HVN 60 - "She Cries Your Name", Beth Orton (1996)
 HVN 64 - "Touch Me with Your Love", Beth Orton (1996)
 HVN 65 - "Someone's Daughter", Beth Orton (1997)
 HVN 68 - "She Cries Your Name", Beth Orton (1997)
 HVN 69 - The Blue Man EP, Famous Times (1997)
 HVN 70 - "Any Way You Look", Northern Uproar (1997)
 HVN 72 - "Best Bit", Beth Orton (1997)
 HVN 73 - "A Girl I Once Knew", Northern Uproar (1997)
 HVN 77 - "Goodbye", Northern Uproar (1997)
 HVN 87 - "Mo' Pop", Dot Allison (1999)
 HVN 89 - "Stolen Car", Beth Orton (1999)
 HVN 91 - "Message Personnel", Dot Allison (1999)
 HVN 93 - "Close Your Eyes", Dot Allison (1999)
 HVN 95 - "The Cedar Room", Doves (2000)
 HVN 96 - "Catch the Sun", Doves (2000)
 HVN 98 - "The Man Who Told Everything", Doves (2000)
 HVN 100 - NME Presents: A Taste of Heavenly Recordings, Various (2002)

HVN 101 - 200
 HVN 101 - "Something in My Eye", Ed Harcourt (2001)
 HVN 104 - "She Fell Into My Arms", Ed Harcourt (2001)
 HVN 107 - "Apple of My Eye", Ed Harcourt (2002)
 HVN 110 - "Shanghai", Ed Harcourt (2002) [cancelled release]
 HVN 111 - "There Goes the Fear", Doves (2002)
 HVN 112 - "Highly Evolved", The Vines (2002)
 HVN 113 - "Get Free", The Vines (2002)
 HVN 116 - "Pounding", Doves (2002)
 HVN 120 - "Outtathaway!", The Vines (2002)
 HVN 121 - "Still I Dream of It"/"The Ghosts Parade", Ed Harcourt (2002)
 HVN 125 - "Anywhere", Beth Orton (2002)
 HVN 126 - "Caught by the River", Doves (2002)
 HVN 127 - "All of Your Days Will Be Blessed", Ed Harcourt (2003)
 HVN 129 - "Thinking About Tomorrow", Beth Orton (2002)
 HVN 130 - "Watching the Sun Come Up", Ed Harcourt (2003)
 HVN 140 - "This One's for You", Ed Harcourt (2004)
 HVN 144 - "22 Days", 22-20s (2004)
 HVN 145 - "Black and White Town", Doves (2005)
 HVN 146 - "Born in the '70s", Ed Harcourt (2004)
 HVN 149 - "Loneliness", Ed Harcourt (2005)
 HVN 150 - "Snowden", Doves (2005)
 HVN 151 - "Forever Lost", The Magic Numbers (2005)
 HVN 152 - "Sky Starts Falling", Doves (2005)
 HVN 157 - "Visit from the Dead Dog", Ed Harcourt (2006)
 HVN 161 - "Revolution in the Heart", Ed Harcourt (2006)
 HVN 167 - "Mathematics", Cherry Ghost (2007)
 HVN 168 - "People Help the People", Cherry Ghost (2007)
 HVN 171 - "4 AM", Cherry Ghost (2007)
 HVN 172 - "You Put a Spell on Me", Ed Harcourt (2007)
 HVN 183 - "Burnt Out Car", Saint Etienne (2008)
 HVN 185 - "Method of Modern Love", Saint Etienne (2009)
 HVN 189 - "Kingdom of Rust", Doves (2009)
 HVN 192 - "Winter Hill", Doves (2009)

HVN 201 - 300
 HVN 201 - "Andalucia", Doves (2010)
 HVN202 – "Lines Written in Winter", Fionn Regan
 HVN203 – "Kissing Strangers", Cherry Ghost
 HVN204 – "Why Did You Call", The Magic Numbers
 HVN205 – "Losing Sleep", Edwyn Collins
 HVN206 – "Black Fang", Cherry Ghost
 HVN207 – "The Woods", Sea of Bees
 HVN208 – (Rough Trade bonus disc), Edwyn Collins
 HVN209 – "We Sleep on Stones", Cherry Ghost
 HVN210 - "Gandhi (Andy Weather¬all remix I)", LCMDF
 HVN211 – "Do It Again", Edwyn Collins
 HVN212 – "No One but You", Doug Paisley
 HVN213 – "Lost in My Mind", The Head & The Heart
 HVN214 – "Future Me", LCMDF
 HVN215 – "Wizbot", Sea of Bees
 HVN216 – "The Hill", James Walbourne
 HVN217 – Bee Eee Pee (EP), Sea of Bees
 HVN218 – "I'm Bored", Big Kids
 HVN219 – "In Your Eyes", Edwyn Collins & The Drums
 HVN220 – 3-track EP download ("Passing of Time" - Trevor Moss & Hannah-Lou, "BBC" - James Walbourne, "The Woods" – Sea of Bees)
 HVN221 – "Spin Me a Rhyme", Trevor Moss & Hannah-Lou
 HVN222 – "Only a Mother", Cherry Ghost
 HVN223 – "Gnomes", Sea of Bees
 HVN224 – "Extinction", Will Seargent
 HVN225 – "Cool & Bored", LCMDF
 HVN226 – "Making It Count", Trevor Moss & Hannah-Lou
 HVN227 – "Rivers & Roads", The Head And The Heart
 HVN228 – "For a Nightingale", Fionn Regan
 HVN229 – "Take Me to the Mountains", LCMDF
 HVN230 – "Drugs and Money", James Walbourne
 HVN231 – "Pray to Be Free", James Levy & The Blood Red Rose
 HVN232 – "Ghosts", The Head and The Heart
 HVN233 – "Left Myself Behind", Toy 
 HVN234 – "Big Water", Trevor Moss and Hannah-Lou
 HVN235 – "List of Distractions", Fionn Regan
 HVN236 – Sneak Into My Room (EP), James Levy & The Blood Red Rose
 HVN237 – Xmas '11 EP, Saint Etienne
 HVN238 – "Tonight", Saint Etienne
 HVN239 – "Broke", Sea of Bees
 HVN240 – "Shut Eye", Stealing Sheep
 HVN241 – "Motoring", Toy
 HVN242 – Promo EP, Toy
 HVN243 – "I've Got Your Music", Saint Etienne
 HVN244 – "Hung to Dry", James Levy and The Blood Red Rose
 HVN245 – "Genevieve", Stealing Sheep
 HVN246 – "Dead and Gone", Toy
 HVN247 – "Lose My Way", Toy
 HVNCB – "Ducks", Charlie Boyer
 HVN249 – "I Watch You", Charlie Boyer and The Voyeurs

Discographies of British record labels